Thomas Maclellan may refer to:

Thomas Maclellan of Bombie (died 1597), Provost of Kirkcudbright
Thomas Maclellan, 2nd Lord Kirkcudbright (died 1647), Scottish nobleman, grandson of the above

See also
A. Thomas McLellan (born 1949), psychologist

MacLellan (surname)